Rushenden is a village on the Isle of Sheppey in the Borough of Swale in Kent, England, of approximately 500 dwellings. It lies to the south of Queenborough (where, at the 2011 Census, the population was included).  A railway spur line formerly passed through the village to a former wharf on the Swale, although this has now been removed to make way for part of the regeneration scheme.

Regeneration
The masterplan for Queenborough and Rushenden (created in 2003) represents an “exemplar for other masterplanning projects in the Thames Gateway” (South East Regional Design Panel May 2006).

The plan includes a Green Charter and Arts strategy which aims to ensure that the development addresses sustainability as well as using art to act as the “glue” that binds the community together with its surrounding landscape.

The masterplan (by Homes and Communities Agency with Swale Council) sets out a comprehensive approach to regenerating Queenborough and Rushenden. It involves harnessing its setting, history and people, and combining with them proposals for housing, employment, community facilities and recreation.

The vision for the masterplan creates a mixed-use development with the potential to support:
 1,800 new homes, split 50/50 between family housing and apartments, rated as Code Level 4 increasing to zero carbon
 Up to 180,000 square metres of new employment space with the ability to support over 1,000 new jobs
 Up to 20 hectares of brownfield land remediated 
 180 berth marina and community water space facility
 Improved public realm
 Provision of new community/educational Facilities
 1.5 km of new strategic infrastructure
 Development of a combined heat and power plant (CHP).

The regeneration plan will cost up to £400 million.

References

External links

Villages in Kent
Isle of Sheppey